Côme Ledogar (born 23 May 1991) is a professional racing driver from France. He is best known for winning the Blancpain GT Series Endurance Cup overall title in 2016, with Robert Bell and Shane van Gisbergen, and for winning the 2021 24 Hours of Spa overall and the 2021 24 Hours of Le Mans in the GTE Pro class.

Career

Formula Renault 1.6
Born in Annecy, Ledogar began his racing career in 2007 at the age of 16, making his début in single-seater in the Formula Renault 1.6 Belgium for Thierry Boutsen Energy Racing. For 2008 he joined Formul'Academy Euro Series, which used the same Formula Renault 1.6 cars. He won four from fourteen races and had another two podium finishes, losing the title to Arthur Pic.

Formula BMW
In 2009, Ledogar moved to the Formula BMW Europe, joining DAMS team. He finished nine from sixteen races in points to finish season 17th. For the next year he switched to  Eifelland Racing. He had three podium finishes, improving to the sixth in the standings.

Formula Renault 2.0
In 2011, he switched to the Eurocup Formula Renault 2.0, with the R-ace GP. He ended season 19th with three point-scoring finishes. He also had a part-time campaign in Formula Renault 2.0 Northern European Cup with the same team, achieving podium finish at Zandvoort.

Sports car racing

In 2012, Ledogar decided to switch to sports car racing, joining Pro GT by Alméras in the Porsche Carrera Cup France. He won four from fourteen races but lost 22 points in the championship battle to Jean-Karl Vernay. He remained in the Cup for 2013, switching to Sébastien Loeb Racing, but wasn't able to improve his position in the standings, winning only two races. For 2014 he returned to Alméras team, finally winning the series, with four-point margin over Maxime Jousse after six race wins and another two podium finishes.

For 2015 Ledogar had a double campaign in both Porsche Supercup and Carrera Cup Italia. He was victorious in the Italian series at Monza, Imola, Misano and Mugello and had another seven podiums on his way to the runner-up place behind Riccardo Agostini. While in the Supercup he was eight in the standings, and the second-best season rookie with a podium at Hungaroring.

In 2016, Ledogar continued to race in the Carrera Cup Italia. He amassed Mattia Drudi by 19 points in the championship battle and had six race wins with eight another podium finishes. Also he became a McLaren factory driver. He competed behind the wheel of McLaren 650S GT3 in the 2016 International GT Open and 2016 Blancpain GT Series with Garage 59 team. He won Monza GT Open race, but as he wasn't on the full schedule he finished only eleventh in the standings. While in the 2016 Blancpain GT Series Endurance Cup, which was part of the Blancpain GT Series, he became champion with Robert Bell and Shane van Gisbergen.

For 2017, Ledogar was more concentrated on GT Open, staying with Garage 59, pairing with Alexander West. He finished third in the Pro-Am standings. While in the 2017 Blancpain GT Series he joined Strakka Racing. But he finished only 69th, with just two points, which was scored on the opening round of the 2017 Blancpain GT Series Endurance Cup.

In 2018, Ledogar rejoined Garage 59 squad in the Blancpain GT Series Endurance Cup, becoming teammate of Ben Barnicoat and Andrew Watson.

In 2019, Ledogar left McLaren and joined Garage 59 to drive an Aston Martin Vantage at the Blancpain GT Series Endurance Cup together with Jonny Adam and Andrew Watson, and at two additional rounds of the Intercontinental GT Challenge with Chris Goodwin and Alexander West. Also he drove a Ferrari 488 at the 24 Hours of Le Mans with Car Guy Racing.

He drove for Garage 59 at the 2020 Bathurst 12 Hour, and entered three rounds of the 2019–20 Asian Le Mans Series with Car Guy Racing, scoring a win at The Bend.

After the COVID-19 pandemic's first lockdown, the Frenchman entered the Silverstone round of the 2020 Porsche Supercup. Then he drove a Ferrari 488 at the 24 Hours of Le Mans and at the Paul Ricard round of the GT World Challenge Europe Endurance Cup with AF Corse, winning the latter with Tom Blomqvist and Alessandro Pier Guidi.

In 2021, Car Guy Racing hired the driver for the Asian Le Mans Series, winning the final race. He joined Iron Lynx for the GT World Challenge Europe Endurance Cup, partnering with Pier Guidi and Nicklas Nielsen. The trio won the 2021 24 Hours of Spa. In addition, AF Corse hired him as third driver for the 24 Hours of Le Mans, claiming the win at the GTE Pro class.

Racing record

Career summary

* Season still in progress.

† Guest driver ineligible to score points

Complete Blancpain GT Series Sprint Cup results

Complete 24 Hours of Le Mans results

References

External links

1991 births
Living people
Sportspeople from Annecy
French racing drivers
French F4 Championship drivers
Formula BMW Europe drivers
Formula Renault Eurocup drivers
Formula Renault 2.0 NEC drivers
Blancpain Endurance Series drivers
Porsche Supercup drivers
International GT Open drivers
24 Hours of Le Mans drivers
24 Hours of Spa drivers
WeatherTech SportsCar Championship drivers
FIA World Endurance Championship drivers
24H Series drivers
Asian Le Mans Series drivers
Auto Sport Academy drivers
DAMS drivers
Eifelland Racing drivers
R-ace GP drivers
Josef Kaufmann Racing drivers
Strakka Racing drivers
Meyer Shank Racing drivers
AF Corse drivers
Belgian Formula Renault 1.6 drivers
Australian Endurance Championship drivers
Aston Martin Racing drivers
Nürburgring 24 Hours drivers
McLaren Racing drivers
Iron Lynx drivers
Porsche Carrera Cup Germany drivers